Callionymus variegatus is a species of dragonet native to the Pacific waters around southern Japan.  This species grows to a length of  SL.

References 

V